The following is a list of notable events and releases of the year 1881 in Norwegian music.

Events

Deaths

Births

 May
 7 – Edvard Sylou-Creutz, classical pianist, composer and radio personality (died 1945).

 August
 27 – Sigurd Islandsmoen, composer and painter (died 1964).
 28 – Arne Eggen, composer and organist (died 1955).

See also
 1881 in Norway
 Music of Norway

References

 
Norwegian music
Norwegian
Music
1880s in Norwegian music